The RCA connector is a type of electrical connector commonly used to carry audio and video signals.  The name RCA derives from the company Radio Corporation of America, which introduced the design in the 1930s.  The connectors male plug and female jack are called RCA plug and RCA jack.

It is also called RCA phono connector or phono connector. The word phono in phono connector is an abbreviation of the word phonograph, because this connector was originally created to allow the connection of a phonograph turntable to a radio receiver. RCA jacks are often used in phono inputs, a set of input jacks usually located on the rear panel of a preamp, mixer or amplifier, especially on early radio sets, to which a phonograph or turntable is attached.

History

By no later than 1937, RCA introduced this design as an internal connector in their radio-phonograph floor consoles.  The amplifier chassis had female connectors which accepted male cables from the radio chassis and phonograph player.  Originally, the concept was intended as an easy method to unhook sources while troubleshooting the console during servicing.

By no later than 1938, RCA migrated the female connector to the rear panel of many of their desktop AM radio models to allow customers an easy method to attach an external phonograph or television at a later date.  The connector was labelled on the back of radio with one of the following terms: "Victrola", "Phono", "Pick-up", "Television".  RCA later marketed a special turntable for 45 RPM records, the model 9JY.

In 1939, RCA introduced two radio-television floor consoles (TRK-9, TRK-12) which used the same internal connection concept but the audio output of the television chassis was connected to the radio/amplifier chassis via a male to male cable. Three lower-cost 1939 television models had an audio output connector on their rear panel instead of an integrated amplifier and speaker: RCA TT-5, Westinghouse WRT-700, GE HM-171.

In the 1950s, RCA connectors began to replace the older quarter-inch ( inch) phone connectors for many other applications in the consumer audio world when component high-fidelity systems started becoming popular during the transistor revolution.  Refinement of the RCA connectors came with later designs, although they remained compatible.

Other uses

In the most normal use, cables have a standard plug on each end, consisting of a central male connector, surrounded by a ring. The ring is often segmented to provide spring gripping pressure when mated. Devices mount the socket (female jack), consisting of a central hole with a ring of metal around it. The ring on the jack is slightly smaller in diameter and longer than the ring on the plug, allowing the plug's ring to fit tightly over it. The jack has a small area between the outer and inner rings which is filled with an insulator, typically plastic (very early versions, or those made for use as RF connectors, used ceramic).

The RCA connector was initially used for audio signals. As with many other connectors, it has been adopted for uses other than originally intended, including as a DC power connector, an RF connector, and as a connector for loudspeaker cables. Its use as a connector for composite video signals is extremely common, but provides poor impedance matching. RCA connectors and cable are also commonly used to carry S/PDIF-formatted digital audio, with plugs colored orange to differentiate them from other typical connections.

Connections are made by pushing the cable's plug into the female jack on the device. The signal-carrying pin protrudes from the plug, and often comes into contact with the socket before the grounded rings meet, resulting in loud hum or buzz if the audio components do not share a common ground and are powered while making connections. Continuous noise can occur if the plug partially falls out of the jack, breaking the ground connection but not the signal.  Some variants of the plug, especially cheaper versions, also give very poor grip and contact between the ground sheaths due to their lack of spring action.

They are often color-coded, yellow for composite video, red for the right audio channel, and white or black for the left channel of stereo audio. This trio (or pair) of jacks can often be found on the back of audio and video equipment. One or more sets are often found on TV sets to facilitate connection of camcorders, other portable video sources and video game consoles. Although nearly all connectors, including analog and S/PDIF audio as well as composite and component video, can use identical 75 Ω cables, sales of special-purpose cables for each use have proliferated. Varying cable quality means that a cheap line-level audio cable might not successfully transfer component video. For digital audio, as long as a connection is successfully made using the cables the sound will remain faithful to the original signal because a digital signal can only be fully received or not received at all. Cables should meet the S/PDIF specification as defined by the international standard IEC 60958-3 for assured performance.

The male plug has a center pin which is 3.175 mm (1/8 inch) in diameter, and is surrounded by an outer shell which is 8.25 mm (1/3 inch) in diameter.

Disadvantages

When connecting the male into the female, the inner hot (signal) connection is made before the ground connection has been guaranteed; this often produces a loud buzz if the equipment is active when the connection is made.

The hot signal wire and signal ground provided by an RCA connection implement an unbalanced connection. A true balanced connection is generally preferred in certain applications, particularly professional settings because it allows for the use of long cables while reducing susceptibility to external noise.

Using RCA connectors, each signal requires its own plug. Even the simple case of attaching a cassette deck may need four of themtwo for stereo input and two for stereo output. In any common setup this quickly leads to a disarray of cables and confusion in how to connect them. This situation is made worse if one considers more complex signals like component video (a total of three for video and two for analog audio or one for digital coaxial audio).

There have been attempts to introduce combined audio/video connectors for direct signals, but in the analog realm none of these has ever become common, with the exception of Europe where the SCART connector was very successful.  For a time the 5-pin DIN connector was popular for bi-directional stereo connection between A/V equipment, but it has been entirely displaced on modern consumer devices.  Though RF modulators inherently transmit combined A/V signals in video applications, they depend on broadcast television systems and RF connectors which are not universal worldwide; RF signals are also generally inferior to direct signals due to protocol conversion and the RF limitations of the three major analog TV systems (NTSC, PAL and SECAM).

Before HD television became a standard, nearly all TV sets, VCRs, and DVD players sold in Europe had SCART connectors, although these are sometimes supplemented by RCA and/or RF connectors. SCART-RCA adapters also exist, which usually allow input of composite video and stereo audio. Outside Europe, separate RCA connectors are usually used, supplemented by RF connectors for backward compatibility and simplicity. Although mini-DIN connectors are used for S-Video connections, composite video, component video, and analog audio (mono or stereo) all use RCA connectors unless the signals are sent via SCART. In the digital realm, however, combined A/V connectors are gaining ground; HDMI is commonly used today for consumer electronics, and DisplayPort, a potential competitor to HDMI, is often found on home computers and peripherals.

Color coding in consumer equipment
Plugs and sockets on consumer equipment are conventionally color-coded to aid correct connections. The standard colors for the various signals are shown below; however, beyond 7.1 audio, the standard has degraded to a more general white/yellow, red/blue, and green/yellow color scheme for each cable respectively.

Stereo audio applications use either black and red, grey and red, or white and red RCA connectors; in all three cases, red denotes right. White or purple may also be replaced by black. Some older tape recorders, and equipment like receivers designed to connect to them, use a 5-pin DIN connector to connect left and right for record and playback with a single cable. Adapters between this connector and RCA connectors have used white and red for left and right channel recording, and blue (or sometimes black) and yellow for playback, but this is not universal. Most modern equipment with RCA connectors for recording devices simply uses white and red for all stereo pairs, whether record or playback.

While these are the standard colors found on commercially made products, cables with different-colored connectors may be used, as long as the cable itself is compatible with the application (for example, cables with 75 ohms impedance for video and S/PDIF).

Examples of devices with RCA jacks

References

External links

Electrical connectors
Audiovisual connectors
RF connectors